Solar power in Oklahoma can provide 44.1% of all electricity used in Oklahoma from 19,300 MW of rooftop solar panels. This scenario is extremely unlikely though because the cost of electricity in Oklahoma is among the lowest in the nation.

Net metering 
Net metering is available to all consumers generating up to 25kW installed behind a single meter. The 25kW limit is more than adequate for the typical home. Solar systems sized above this limit can create subsidies from consumers without solar installations. 
 giving the state an F. The primary reason to use net metering is to roll over summer generation to winter usage, which requires continuous roll over of excess generation. Net metering during the month does, however, allow generation during the day when all the lights are off and everyone is away to be used at night, after the sun has gone down. Since meters are read once a month, daily net metering is not reported. As more renewable energy is used, utilities have needed to become accustomed to incorporating local distributed generation.

Combined solar, wind, and battery storage plans 
In July 2019, the Western Farmers Electric Cooperative (WFEC) announced plans for the largest combined wind, solar, and energy storage project in the US, 250 MW solar energy project, Skeleton Creek Solar, a 200 MW, 4-hour battery energy storage project, Skeleton Creek Storage, and a 250 megawatt wind farm, Skeleton Creek Wind. The solar and battery facilities are slated to come online in 2023.

Solar challenge 
In 2010, the American Solar Challenge, a solar car race, ran from Oklahoma to Illinois.

Statistics
There are no concentrated solar power (CSP) plants planned for Oklahoma, but the state has the potential to install 1,813,000 MW of CSP, capable of generating 5,068,036 million kWh/year.

See also
Wind power in Oklahoma
Solar power in the United States
Renewable energy in the United States

References

External links
 Incentives and Policies

Energy in Oklahoma
Oklahoma